Deiveega Uravu is a 1968 Indian Tamil-language film starring Jaishankar and Devika, with Nagesh, V. K. Ramasamy, Master Sridhar and R. S. Manohar appearing in supporting roles. It was released on 10 May 1968.

Plot

Cast 
Jaishankar
Devika
Nagesh
V. K. Ramasamy
Sachu
Master Sridhar
Pakoda Kadhar
R. S. Manohar
 S. V. Sahasranamam
 Radhika
 Baby Raji
 Thengai Srinivasan (guest role)
 T. P. Muthulakshmi
 S. Rama Rao
 S. V. Subbaiah (guest role)

Soundtrack 
The music was composed by K. V. Mahadevan.

References

External links 
 

1960s Tamil-language films